Victoria Wood  (19 May 1953 – 20 April 2016) was an English comedian, actress, lyricist, singer, composer, pianist, screenwriter, producer and director.

Wood wrote and starred in dozens of sketches, plays, musicals, films and sitcoms over several decades and her live comedy act was interspersed with her own compositions which she performed at the piano. Much of her humour was grounded in everyday life and included references to activities, attitudes and products that are considered to exemplify Britain. She was noted for her skills in observational comedy and in satirising aspects of social class.

Wood started her career in 1974 by appearing on, and winning, the ATV talent show New Faces. She established herself as a comedy star in the 1980s, winning a BAFTA TV Award in 1986 for the sketch series Victoria Wood: As Seen on TV (1985–87), and became one of Britain's most popular stand-up comics, winning a second BAFTA for An Audience with Victoria Wood (1988). In the 1990s, she wrote and co-starred in the television film Pat and Margaret (1994), and the sitcom dinnerladies (1998–2000), which she also produced. She won two more BAFTA TV Awards, including Best Actress, for her 2006 ITV1 television film, Housewife, 49. Her frequent long-term collaborators included Julie Walters, Celia Imrie, Duncan Preston, and Anne Reid. In 2006, Wood came tenth in ITV's poll of the British public's 50 Greatest TV Stars.

Early life
Victoria Wood was the youngest child of Stanley Wood, an insurance salesman, who also wrote songs for his company's Christmas parties, was the author of the musical play "Clogs" based in a Lancashire village in 1887 and also wrote part time for Coronation Street, Northern Drift and others; and Ellen "Nellie" Wood (née Mape). She had three siblings: a brother, Chris, and two sisters, Penny and Rosalind.

Wood was born in Prestwich and brought up in nearby Bury. She was educated at Fairfield County Primary School and Bury Grammar School for Girls, where she immediately found herself out of her depth.

Wood developed eating disorders, but in 1968, her father gave her a piano for her 15th birthday. She later said of this unhappy time "The good thing about being isolated is you get a good look at what goes on. I was reading, writing and working at the piano all the time. I was doing a lot of other things that helped me to perform". Later that year, she joined the Rochdale Youth Theatre Workshop, where she felt she was "in the right place and knew what I was doing" and she made an impression with her comic skill and skill in writing. She went on to study in the Department of Drama and Theatre Arts at the University of Birmingham.

Career

1970s
Wood began her show business career while an undergraduate, appearing on the TV talent show New Faces in 1974. It led to an appearance in a sketch show featuring the series' winners The Summer Show. A further break came as a novelty act on the BBC's consumer affairs programme That's Life! in 1976. She had met long-term collaborator Julie Walters in 1971, when Wood applied to the Manchester School of Theatre, then part of Manchester Polytechnic. Coincidentally the pair met again when they appeared in the same theatre revue In at the Death in 1978 (for which Wood wrote a brief sketch). Its success led to the commissioning of Wood's first play Talent (in 1978), starring Hazel Clyne (in a role originally written for Walters), for which Wood won an award for the Most Promising New Writer. Peter Eckersley, the head of drama at Granada Television, saw Talent and invited Wood to create a television adaptation. This time, Julie Walters took the lead role, while Wood reprised her stage role.

1980–1988
The success of the television version of Talent led to Wood writing the follow-up Nearly a Happy Ending. Shortly afterwards she wrote a third play for Granada, Happy Since I Met You, again with Walters alongside Duncan Preston as the male lead. In 1980 she wrote and starred in the stage play Good Fun.

Recognising her talent, Eckersley offered Wood a sketch show, although Wood was unsure of the project: she only agreed to go ahead if Walters received equal billing. Eckersley came up with an obvious title – Wood and Walters, and the pilot episode was recorded. It led to a full series, featuring Duncan Preston and a supporting cast. In the period between the completion of the pilot and the shooting of the series, Eckersley died. Wood credited him with giving her her first big break, and felt that Wood and Walters suffered due to his death. She was not impressed by Brian Armstrong, his fill-in, and was of the opinion that he hired unsuitable supporting actors.

Wood appeared as a presenter in Yorkshire Television's 1984 schools television programme for hearing-impaired children, Insight, in a remake of the series originally presented by Derek Griffiths. In 1982 and 1983 she appeared as a panellist on BBC Radio 4's Just a Minute.

In October 1983 Wood performed her first solo stand-up show, Lucky Bag, in a five-week run at the King's Head Theatre in Islington. The show transferred to the Ambassadors Theatre for a 12-night run in February 1984. Lucky Bag went on a short UK tour in November and December 1984 and was also released as a live album recorded at the Edinburgh Festival in 1983.

Wood left Granada in 1984 for the BBC, which promised her more creative control over projects. Later that year her sketch show Victoria Wood: As Seen on TV went into production. Wood chose the actors: her friend Julie Walters once again starred, as did Duncan Preston. Wood's friends Celia Imrie, Susie Blake and Patricia Routledge were in the cast. As Seen on TV featured the Acorn Antiques series of sketches, parodying the low-budget soap opera Crossroads, and rumoured to be named after an antiques shop in her birthplace. Acorn Antiques is remembered for characters such as "Mrs Overall" (played by Walters), the deliberately bad camera angles and wobbling sets, and Celia Imrie's sarcastic tone as "Miss Babs". One of Wood's most popular comic songs, "The Ballad of Barry and Freda (Let's Do It)", originated on this show. It tells the story of Freda (a woman eager for sex) and Barry (an introverted man terrified of intimate relations), and makes clever use of allusions to a multitude of risqué activities while avoiding all taboo words.

Following the success of the first series of Victoria Wood: As Seen on TV, Wood went on tour again with Lucky Bag in March 1985. Scene, a documentary for BBC2 later that year, showed footage of Wood preparing for the tour.

A second series of Victoria Wood: As Seen on TV was made in 1986. Before filming began in the summer, Wood went on a short 23 date tour of England and Scotland during March and April. A final 'Special' 40-minute episode of As Seen on TV was made in 1987 and broadcast later that year.

During autumn 1987 Wood went on the road with what was to be her largest tour yet. The tour included a sell-out two-week run at the London Palladium, and had a second leg in the spring of 1988.

In 1988 she appeared in the BAFTA-winning An Audience with Victoria Wood for ITV. At the time of recording the show she was six months pregnant. The end of 1988 saw the release of her second live performance Victoria Wood Live, recorded at the Brighton Dome.

1989–1999
During this period Wood moved away from the sketch show format and into more self-contained works, often with a bittersweet flavour. Victoria Wood (six parts, 1989) featured Wood in several individual stories such as "We'd Quite Like To Apologise", set in an airport departure lounge, and "Over to Pam", set around a fictional talk show.

In May 1990, Wood began a large tour of the United Kingdom, which was followed by a ten-week run at the Strand Theatre in London titled Victoria Wood Up West. Wood took the show on the road again during March and April 1991, where it was recorded at the Mayflower Theatre in Southampton, and later released as Victoria Wood Sold Out in 1991.

In 1991, she appeared on the Comic Relief single performing "The Smile Song", the flipside to "The Stonk" (a record by ITV comedians
Gareth Hale and Norman Pace with charity supergroup The Stonkers). 
A UK number-one single for one week on 23 March 1991, the record was the UK's 22nd-best-selling single of the year. However, even though it was a joint-single (with "The Smile Song" credited on the front of the single cover and listed as track 2 on the seven-inch and CD single rather than being a B-side), the UK singles chart compilers (now the Official Charts Company) did not credit her with having number one hit, in a situation similar to the fate of BAD II's "Rush", the AA-side of the preceding number one, "Should I Stay or Should I Go" by The Clash.

She briefly returned to sketches for the 1992 Christmas Day special Victoria Wood's All Day Breakfast, and also branched out into children's animation, voicing all the characters for the CBBC series Puppydog Tales.

In April 1993, Wood began a seven-month tour of the UK. The 104-date tour broke box office records, including 15 sell out shows at London's Royal Albert Hall, and played to residencies in Sheffield, Birmingham, Plymouth, Bristol, Nottingham, Manchester, Leicester, Liverpool, Bournemouth, Oxford, Southampton, Newcastle, Glasgow, Edinburgh, Leeds and Hull.

The television film Pat and Margaret (1994), starring Wood and Julie Walters as long-lost sisters with very different lifestyles, continued her return to stand-alone plays with a poignant undercurrent to the comedy.

In 1994, Wood starred in the one-off BBC 50-minute programme based on her 1993/94 stage show Victoria Wood: Live in Your Own Home. The special featured stand-up routines, character monologues and songs. An extended 80 minute version was released on VHS.

Wood set out on a 68-date tour of the UK in May 1996, which played at venues in Leicester, Sheffield, Ipswich, Blackpool, Wolverhampton, Bradford, Newcastle, Bournemouth, Brighton, Nottingham, Oxford, Southend, Manchester and Cambridge. The tour culminated with another 15 sell-out shows at London's Royal Albert Hall in the autumn. The tour recommenced in April 1997 in Liverpool and then travelled to Australia and New Zealand during the summer. It was later released as Victoria Wood Live 1997.

In October 1997, Wood released a compilation of 14 of her songs titled Victoria Wood, Real Life The Songs.

Her first sitcom dinnerladies (1998), continued her now established milieu of mostly female, mostly middle-aged characters depicted vividly and amusingly, but with a counterpoint of sadder themes.

2000–2005
December 2000 saw the Christmas sketch show special Victoria Wood with All the Trimmings, featuring her regular troupe of actors as well as a string of special guest stars including Hugh Laurie, Angela Rippon, Bob Monkhouse, Bill Paterson, Delia Smith and Roger Moore.

2001 saw Wood embark on her final stand-up tour, Victoria Wood at It Again but was postponed slightly by Wood having to have an emergency hysterectomy shortly before the tour was due to begin. She re-wrote the entire first half of the show and incorporated the operation into her act. The 62-date tour included 12 nights at the Royal Albert Hall and had a further 23 dates in 2002.

During this period, Wood tended to move away from comedy to concentrate on drama. She continued to produce one-off specials including Victoria Wood's Sketch Show Story (2002) and Victoria Wood's Big Fat Documentary (2005).

Wood wrote her first musical, Acorn Antiques: The Musical!, which opened in 2005 at the Theatre Royal, Haymarket, London, for a limited period, directed by Trevor Nunn. It starred several of the original cast, with Sally Ann Triplett playing Miss Berta (played in the series by Wood). Wood played Julie Walters' lead role of Mrs Overall for Monday and Wednesday matinee performances.

2006–2010
Wood wrote the one-off ITV serious drama Housewife, 49 (2006), an adaptation of the diaries of Nella Last, and played the eponymous role of an introverted middle-aged character who discovers new confidence and friendships in Lancashire during the Second World War. Housewife, 49 was critically acclaimed, and Wood won BAFTAs for both her acting and writing for this drama; a rare double. The film also starred Stephanie Cole and David Threlfall as well as, in a small role, Sue Wallace with whom Wood had worked before and studied alongside at Birmingham.

In November 2006, Wood directed a revival production of Acorn Antiques: The Musical! with a new cast. The musical opened at the Lowry in Salford in December and toured the United Kingdom from January to July 2007.

In January 2007, she appeared as herself in a series of advertisements featuring famous people working for the supermarket chain Asda. They featured Wood working in the bakery and introduced a catchphrase – "there's no place like ASDA". Wood was the subject of an episode of The South Bank Show in March 2007, and is the only woman to be the subject of two South Bank programmes (the previous occasion was in September 1996).

Wood appeared in a three-part travel documentary on BBC One called Victoria's Empire, in which she travelled around the world in search of the history, cultural impact and customs the British Empire placed on the parts of the world it ruled. She departed Victoria Station, London, for Calcutta, Hong Kong and Borneo in the first programme. In programme two she visited Ghana, Jamaica and Newfoundland and in the final programme, New Zealand, Australia and Zambia, finishing at the Victoria Falls.

In a tribute to Wood, the British television station UKTV Gold celebrated her work with a weekend marathon of programmes between 3 and 4 November 2007, featuring programmes such as Victoria Wood Live and Dinnerladies and Victoria Wood: As Seen on TV – its first screening on British television since 1995.

Wood returned to stand-up comedy, with a special performance for the celebratory show Happy Birthday BAFTA on 28 October 2007, alongside other household names. The programme was transmitted on ITV1 on Wednesday 7 November 2007. On Boxing Day 2007 she appeared as "Nana" in the Granada dramatisation of Noel Streatfeild's novel Ballet Shoes.

In December 2007, when a guest on the radio programme Desert Island Discs, Wood said she was about to make her first foray into film, writing a script described as a contemporary comedy about a middle-aged person. On Thursday, 12 June 2008, Wood was a member of the celebrity guest panel on the series The Apprentice: You're Fired! on BBC Two. In June 2009, she appeared as a panellist on the first two episodes of a series of I'm Sorry I Haven't a Clue.

In 2009, Wood provided the voice of God for Liberace, Live From Heaven by Julian Woolford at London's Leicester Square Theatre. Wood returned to television comedy for a one-off Christmas sketch-show special, her first for nine years, Victoria Wood's Mid Life Christmas, transmitted on BBC One at 21:00 on Christmas Eve 2009. It reunited Wood with Julie Walters in Lark Pies to Cranchesterford, a spoof of BBC period dramas Lark Rise to Candleford, Little Dorrit and Cranford; a spoof documentary, Beyond the Marigolds, following Acorn Antiques star Bo Beaumont (Walters); highlights from the Mid Life Olympics 2009 with Wood as the commentator; parodies of personal injury advertisements; and a reprise of Wood's most famous song "The Ballad of Barry and Freda" ("Let's Do It"), performed as a musical number with tap-dancers and a band. Victoria Wood: Seen On TV, a 90-minute documentary looking back on her career, was broadcast on BBC Two on 21 December, whilst a behind-the-scenes special programme about Midlife Christmas, Victoria Wood: What Larks!, was broadcast on BBC One on 30 December.

2011–2016
On New Year's Day 2011, Wood appeared in a BBC drama Eric and Ernie as Eric Morecambe's mother, Sadie Bartholomew.

For the 2011 Manchester International Festival, Wood wrote, composed and directed That Day We Sang, a musical set in 1969 with flashbacks to 1929. It tells the story of a middle-aged couple who find love after meeting on a TV programme about a choir they both sang in 40 years previously. Although the characters are imaginary, the choir sang with the Hallé Youth Orchestra in Manchester's Free Trade Hall on a record that sold more than a million copies. Apart from the pieces on the 1929 recording (Purcell's "Nymphs and Shepherds" and the Evening Benediction from Hansel and Gretel) the score for the musical was written by Wood. She also narrated the 2012 miniseries The Talent Show Story.

On 22 December 2012, Wood was a guest on BBC Radio Two's Saturday morning Graham Norton Show. On 23 December BBC One screened Loving Miss Hatto, a drama written by Wood about the life of concert pianist Joyce Hatto, the centre of a scandal over the authenticity of her recordings and her role in the hoax. In April 2013, Wood produced a documentary about the history of tea named Victoria Wood's Nice Cup of Tea. In 2013 she played retired constable-turned-security-guard Tracy in BBC Scotland's Case Histories starring Jason Isaacs. She appeared in an episode of QI, broadcast on 13 December 2013, and around the same time made two return appearances on I'm Sorry I Haven't a Clue during the show's 60th series in which she joined in the game One song to the tune of Another, singing the Bob the Builder theme "Can We Fix It?" to the tune of "I Dreamed a Dream". In March 2014, Wood voiced the TV advertisement for the tour of the old set of Coronation Street. On 5 December 2014 Wood was a guest on BBC's The Graham Norton Show. On 26 December 2014, a television movie adaptation of That Day We Sang, directed by Wood, starring Michael Ball and Imelda Staunton, was shown on BBC Two.

In early 2015, Wood took part in a celebrity version of The Great British Bake Off for Comic Relief and was crowned Star Baker in her episode. She co-starred with Timothy Spall in Sky television's three-part television adaptation of Fungus the Bogeyman, which was first shown on 27, 28 & 29 December 2015, her final acting role.

Collaborators
Wood was known for using many of the same actors in her projects, which comedian Tiff Stevenson later described as "this core of people who she knew she worked well with, and why would [she] want to walk away from that?" Duncan Preston said of these recurring appearances, "I wouldn't say that we were her favourite actors; I think we were like a company that she had." Celia Imrie commented that Wood's "team" approach "meant that we could work together very fast." An overview of these recurring cast members is shown below:

Awards and recognition
In 1979, Wood received Charles Wintour Award for Most Promising Playwright at the Evening Standard Theatre Awards for her play Talent (play) .

In 1997, Wood was appointed an Officer of the Order of the British Empire (OBE) in the 1997 Birthday Honours. Earlier in 1994, she was made an honorary Doctor of Letters by the University of Sunderland. She was appointed a Commander of the Order of the British Empire (CBE) in the 2008 Birthday Honours.

In 2003, she was listed in The Observer as one of the 50 Funniest Acts in British Comedy. In the 2005 Channel 4 poll the Comedians' Comedian, she was voted 27th out of the top 50 comedy acts by fellow comedians and comedy insiders. She was the highest-ranked woman on the list, above French and Saunders (who paid tribute to her in their Lord of the Rings spoof, where a map of Middle-Earth shows a forest called 'Victoria Wood'), Joan Rivers and Joyce Grenfell.

Her sketch show Victoria Wood: As Seen on TV won BAFTA awards for its two series and Christmas Special. In 2007, she was nominated for and won the BAFTA awards for "Best Actress" and for "Best Single Drama" for her role in the British war-time drama Housewife, 49, in which she played the part of a housewife dominated by her moody husband. Wood's character eventually stands up to him and helps the WRVS (Women's Royal Voluntary Service) in their preparations for British soldiers.

Her popularity with the British public was confirmed when she won 'Best Stand-Up' and 'Best Sketch Show' by Radio Times readers in 2001. Wood was also voted 'Funniest Comedian' by the readers of Reader's Digest in 2005 and came eighth in ITV's poll of the public's 50 Greatest Stars, four places behind long term regular co-star Julie Walters.

Wood was the recipient of six British Comedy Awards: Best stand-up live comedy performer (1990); Best female comedy performer (1995); WGGB Writer of the year (2000); Best live stand-up (2001); Outstanding achievement award (jointly awarded to Julie Walters) (2005); Best female TV comic (2011). Wood was nominated for the 1991 Olivier Award for Best Entertainment for Victoria Wood Up West.

BAFTA nominations
Wood was a 14-time BAFTA TV Award nominee, winning four. She received a special BAFTA at a tribute evening in 2005.

 Victoria Wood: As Seen on TV won the BAFTA for Best Entertainment Programme in 1986, 1987 and 1988; these awards went to the producer, Geoff Posner.
 An Audience With Victoria Wood won the BAFTA for Best Entertainment Programme in 1989; this award went to David G. Hillier.

Personal life
Wood married stage magician Geoffrey Durham in March 1980 and they had two children: Grace, born 1 October 1988 and Henry, born 2 May 1992. The couple separated in October 2002 and divorced in 2005, but continued to live near one another and were on good terms. Her son Henry made a cameo performance as a teenager in Victoria Wood's Mid Life Christmas. He also appeared in the accompanying 'behind the scenes' programme Victoria Wood: What Larks!. Both children had already made appearances as extras on Victoria Wood with All the Trimmings in 2000.

Wood attended Quaker meetings with her husband and was a vegetarian, once remarking, "I'm all for killing animals and turning them into handbags; I just don't want to have to eat them."

Death
Wood was diagnosed with cancer of the oesophagus in late 2015, but kept her illness largely private. She died on 20 April 2016 at her Highgate home, in the presence of her children and former husband.

Her family celebrated her life with a humanist funeral and cremation at Golders Green Crematorium on 5 May 2016.

A memorial service was held for Wood on 4 July 2016 at St James, Piccadilly. The event was accessible via invitation only and tributes were given by Jane Wymark, Daniel Rigby, Harriet Thorpe and Julie Walters. Ria Jones and Michael Ball each performed one of Wood's songs and Nigel Lilley accompanied on the piano.

Tributes
On 15 May 2016, ITV broadcast Let's Do It: A Tribute to Victoria Wood.

In 2017, Wood was the subject of a seven-part show dedicated mainly to extracts from her TV and live work. The main series, titled Our Friend Victoria, aired on BBC One between 11 April and 9 May and concluded later in the year with a Christmas special on 23 December 2017. The seven episodes were presented by Julie Walters, Richard E. Grant, Michael Ball, Maxine Peake, The League of Gentlemen, Daniel Rigby and Anne Reid.

On 17 May 2019, a statue of Wood was unveiled in her home town of Bury in Lancashire.

Bibliography
 
 
 Christopher Foote Wood. Victoria Wood Comedy Genius - Her Life and Work, Published by The Memoir Club, 07552086888,  
 Christopher Foote Wood. Nellie's book : the early life of Victoria Wood's mother, with Nellie Wood (co-author), The History Press (2006),

References

External links

Profile at Caroline's Comedy Base
Victoria Wood at TV Museum
Victoria Wood at BBC Comedy Guide
Return to drama (Manchester Evening News)
BBC Writers Room – Video and text interview with Victoria Wood about writing comedy
The Independent – The 5-Minute Interview: Victoria Wood, comedian and writer

Victoria Wood Obituary BBC News Retrieved 20 April 2016
Victoria Wood obituary, The Guardian, retrieved 21 April 2016
Victoria Wood obituary, The Daily Telegraph, retrieved 21 April 2016
Victoria Wood(Aveleyman)

1953 births
2016 deaths
20th-century English comedians
21st-century English comedians
20th-century English actresses
21st-century English actresses
Actresses from Lancashire
Alumni of the University of Birmingham
Best Actress BAFTA Award (television) winners
Best Entertainment Performance BAFTA Award (television) winners
Deaths from cancer in England
Comedians from Lancashire
Commanders of the Order of the British Empire
English humanists
English Quakers
English stand-up comedians
English television actresses
English television writers
English women comedians
English women pianists
Honorary Members of the Royal Academy of Music
People educated at Bury Grammar School (Girls)
People from Prestwich
People from Bury, Greater Manchester
British women television writers
Writers from Lancashire